Littlewoods (also known as Littlewoods.com) is a British online retailer with headquarters in Speke, Liverpool, England. The brand was launched in the UK in the 1990s.

History
The original Littlewoods brand was a shopping catalogue and retail business headquartered in Liverpool, and was bought by the Barclay brothers in 2002. The website launched in the 1990s and in 2005, the physical stores were sold, leaving Littlewoods as a pure play online retailer. In 2010 a mobile enabled version of the site was launched, upgrading to include video and images in 2011. In the first quarter of 2013/14, mobile sales accounted for over a third of total online sales.

See also 

Very (online retailer)
The Very Group

References

External links 
 

Companies based in Liverpool
Online retailers of the United Kingdom
Clothing retailers of England